Judith P. Hallett is Professor Emerita of Classics, having formerly been the Graduate Director at the Department of Classics, University of Maryland. Her research focuses on women, the family, and sexuality in ancient Greece and Rome, particularly in Latin literature. She is also an expert on classical education and reception in the nineteenth and twentieth centuries.

Biography
Hallett received a BA from Wellesley College and an MA and PhD from Harvard University (1971).

While at Harvard, she studied at the American Academy in Rome. Later on, she spent a year at the Institute of Classical Studies at the University of London. She was elected to the American Philological Association Board of Directors for 1997–1999, and appointed the Vice-President of that Association's Division of Outreach in 1999. She was president of the Classical Association of the Atlantic States in 2000. From 2000 to 2009, she coordinated the CAAS meetings. She was also elected the APA Vice-President for Outreach for 2008–2011. She was a member of the Maryland Humanities Council from 2001 to 2011. From 2002 to 2009 she was a member of the Board of Trustees of the Baltimore Hebrew University, and in 2010 she was appointed to the board of directors of the Thornton Wilder Society. She was also elected president for 2013–2015 of the Gamma of Maryland Chapter of Phi Beta Kappa.

She has participated in several TV shows as an expert guest. From 1986 until 1994 she appeared on the Canadian radio show The Court of Ideas. She was interviewed by Sander Vanocur for the History Channel/A&E series Movies in Time. For the same channels, she was part of a segment for the Valentine's Special on the five greatest love affairs of history and their series The History of Sex (1999). In 2001, she was a consultant for the PBS series The Roman Empire in the First Century, making an appearance on every episode aired.

Honors
She has been honored by the publishing of a festschrift (a celebratory collection of articles) for her contributions to the study of Roman literature and culture. The title of the festschrift is Roman Literature, Gender and Reception: Domina Illustris. She also received the Lambda Classical Caucus (LCC) Activism Award for the year 2015. This award is given to members who have promoted the rights and well-being of sexual minorities beyond the usual academic activities. She was the Suzanne Deal Booth Scholar-in-Residence at the Intercollegiate Center for Classical Studies in Rome for 2017–2018. In March 2018, she was awarded the Lifetime Achievement Award from Eta Sigma Phi, the citation drawing attention not only to her research and teaching but also to her 'stalwart service for the profession'. In April 2018, a one-day international colloquium on women and classical scholarship was held at the University of Maryland to honor her retirement.

Publications
Her publications include Fathers and Daughters in Roman Society: Women and the Elite Family (Princeton, 1984). She edited a special edition of the journal The Classical World with William M. Calder III, 'Six North American Women Classicists' (1996–97). Alongside Marilyn B. Skinner, she edited Roman Sexualities (Princeton, 1997). She also edited Rome and Her Monuments: Essays on the City and Literature of Rome in Honor of Katherine A. Geffcken with Sheila K. Dickison; Women Writing Latin (Routledge, 2002); "Roman Mothers" for the journal Helios (2006); and British Classics Outside England: The Academy and Beyond with Christopher Stray (Baylor, 2008). She also contributed to the Blackwell Companion to Women in the Ancient World (Wiley-Blackwell, 2012) along with Eva Stehle, her colleague at the University of Maryland. She is the co-author of the essay "Roman Elegy and the Roman Novel" with Judith Hindermann for A Companion to the Ancient Novel (Wiley-Blackwell, 2014). She contributed "Omnia Movet Amor: Love and Resistance, Art and Movement in Ovid's Daphne and Apollo Episode (Metamorphoses 1.452-567)" to Kinesis: The Ancient Depiction of Gesture, Motion, and Emotion (Michigan University Press, 2015). She is the co-author of "Raising the Iron Curtain, Crossing the Pond: Transformative Interactions Among North American and Eastern European Classicists since 1945" with Professor Dorota Dutsch for Classics and Class: Greek and Latin Classics and Communism at School (2016). More recently, she has published two essays, "Greek (and Roman) Ways and Thoroughfares: the Routing of Edith Hamilton's Classical Antiquity" and "Eli's Daughters: Female Classics Graduate Students at Yale, 1892-1941", in Women Classical Scholars: Unsealing the Fountain from the Renaissance to Jacqueline de Romily (Oxford University Press, 2016).

Select bibliography 

 'Gender and the Classical Diaspora', Classical Scholarship and Its History: From the Renaissance to the Present. Essays in Honour of Christopher Stray, edited by Stephen Harrison and Christopher Pelling (Berlin, Boston: De Gruyter, 2021) pp. 301-318

References

Living people
Wellesley College alumni
University of Maryland, College Park faculty
Harvard University alumni
Latinists
Classical scholars of the University of London
Women classical scholars
Year of birth missing (living people)